Svetlana Rudolfovna Trefilova (born 20 May 1973) is a Russian retired ice hockey player. She competed in the women's ice hockey tournaments at the 2002 Winter Olympics and the 2006 Winter Olympics.

References

External links
 

1973 births
Living people
Sportspeople from Yekaterinburg
Russian women's ice hockey forwards
Olympic ice hockey players of Russia
Ice hockey players at the 2002 Winter Olympics
Ice hockey players at the 2006 Winter Olympics
HC Tornado players